Alfred McAlpine plc was a British construction firm headquartered in Hooton, Cheshire. It was a major road builder, and constructed over 10% of Britain's motorways, including the M6 Toll (as part of the CAMBBA consortium). It was listed on the London Stock Exchange until it was acquired by Carillion in 2008.

History
Alfred McAlpine was one of the sons of 'Concrete' Bob McAlpine and he ran the operations of Sir Robert McAlpine in the north west of England. In 1935, following the death of Sir Robert and his eldest son, Alfred ran the north west independently, although the legal separation was not completed until 1940, when Sir Alfred McAlpine & Son was formed. Under a non-compete agreement with its former parent company, Sir Alfred McAlpine confined itself to civil engineering and to the north west of England.

After the death of its founder, his son Jimmie McAlpine became chairman. The company was floated on the London Stock Exchange in 1958 under the name Marchwiel Holdings, changing its public name to Alfred McAlpine PLC only in 1985. 
This followed the decision in 1983 to end the non-compete agreement with Robert McAlpine allowing the firm to expand geographically.

McAlpine's status as a civil engineer was enhanced during the 1960s by its participation in the motorway building programme and the company became one of the country's leading civil engineers. There had been some limited diversification, including the purchase of Penrhyn Quarry, the country's largest slate works. As the civil engineering market declined in the 1970s, McAlpine sought to diversify further into private housebuilding. Acquisitions included Price Brothers in 1978, Frank Sanderson's Finlas in 1982 and Canberra in 1988. Investments had also been made in the US housing industry. By the end of the 1980s, private housebuilding was contributing the major part of group profits.

In 1985, Jimmie retired, and handed over chairmanship of the company to his son Robert James "Bobby" McAlpine. In 1991 Bobby brought in an outside chief executive, resigning as chairman in 1992, by which time the family no longer owned a controlling shareholding. Under new management, there was further concentration on private housebuilding, including the acquisition of Raine Industries. By the late 1990s, McAlpine was building over 4,000 houses a year and was one of the industry's top ten. However, there was increasing speculation over the future of the company and, in 2001, it sold its housebuilding operations to George Wimpey. In 2001, it acquired Kennedy Utility Management for £52m. In 2002, it acquired Stiell, a facilities management and information technology network systems business, for £85m. In February 2008, Carillion acquired Alfred McAlpine for £572m.

Structure
It had three business streams:
Business Services: facilities management, information systems, asset management and health and safety management.
Project Services: the Special Projects unit was involved a broad range of commercial, industrial, leisure, educational and medical facilities and the civil engineering unit was focused primarily on road building.
Infrastructure Services: maintenance, renewal and development services to utility operators in the gas, electricity, water and telecoms sectors and roads maintenance services to local government.

It also owned Alfred McAlpine Slate, which was the world's largest producer of natural slate.

Major projects
Projects undertaken by the company included an engine factory for the Bristol Aeroplane Company at Hawthorn completed in 1943, the Royal Liverpool University Hospital completed in 1969, the Scammonden Dam completed in 1970, New Cross Hospital in Wolverhampton completed in 1970, the Alvito Dam in Portugal completed in 1976, Dinorwig Power Station completed in 1984, Manchester Central completed in 1986, Devonshire Dock Hall in Barrow-in-Furness completed in 1986, the Jackfield Bridge completed in 1994, the Royal Armouries Museum in Leeds completed in 1996, the Kirklees Stadium in Huddersfield completed in 1997 (known commercially as the McAlpine Stadium until 2004), the JJB Stadium in Wigan completed in 1999 (now known as the DW Stadium), the Eden Project in St Austell completed in 2001, Wythenshawe Hospital completed in 2001, Hereford County Hospital completed in 2002, the M6 Toll completed in 2003, the redevelopment of Stoke Mandeville Hospital completed in 2006, the new elective care facility for Addenbrooke's Hospital completed in 2007 and the Bluestone Holiday Complex completed in 2008.

References

Sources

External links
Official site
Yahoo profile

Construction and civil engineering companies established in 1935
Construction and civil engineering companies of the United Kingdom
Construction companies based in London
Companies formerly listed on the London Stock Exchange

1935 establishments in England
British companies disestablished in 2008
2008 disestablishments in England
Business services companies established in 1935
Defunct construction and civil engineering companies
2008 mergers and acquisitions
British companies established in 1935
Construction and civil engineering companies disestablished in 2008